HMS Spirit was a S-class submarine of the third batch built for the Royal Navy during World War II. She survived the war and was scrapped in 1950.

Design and description
The third batch was slightly enlarged and improved over the preceding second batch of the S-class. They displaced  on the surface and  submerged. The S-class submarines had a crew of 48 officers and ratings.

For surface running, the boats were powered by two  diesel engines, each driving one propeller shaft. When submerged each propeller was driven by a  electric motor. They could reach  on the surface and  underwater.

The boats were armed with seven 21 inch (533 mm) torpedo tubes. A half-dozen of these were in the bow and there was one external tube in the stern. They carried six reload torpedoes for the bow tubes for a grand total of thirteen torpedoes. Twelve mines could be carried in lieu of the internally stowed torpedoes. They were also armed with a 3-inch (76 mm) deck gun.

Construction and career
HMS Spirit was built by Cammell Laird and launched on 20 July 1943. Thus far she has been the only ship of the Royal Navy to bear the name Spirit. She survived the Second World War, spending most of it with the Eastern Fleet, where she sank four Siamese sailing vessels, the Japanese ship Ryushin Maru and the Japanese coaster Ryuho Maru.  She also sank another unidentified enemy vessel.  Spirit also claimed to have damaged a small Japanese oiler with gunfire to the north of Sumatra. Spirit was eventually paid off, arriving at Thos. W. Ward, of Grays on 4 July 1950 for breaking up.

Notes

References
 
  
 
 
 

 

British S-class submarines (1931)
1943 ships
World War II submarines of the United Kingdom
Ships built on the River Mersey
Royal Navy ship names